Shamushak-e Olya (also Romanized as Shamūshak-e ‘Olyā; also known as Shamūshak-e Bālā) is a village in Roshanabad Rural District, in the Central District of Gorgan County, Golestan Province, Iran. At the 2006 census, its population was 886, in 239 families.

References 

Populated places in Gorgan County